Ivanivka Raion may refer to two raions in Ukraine.
 Ivanivka Raion, Odessa Oblast
 Ivanivka Raion, Kherson Oblast

See also 
 Ivanovsky District
 Ivanovka (disambiguation)